Lehew is an unincorporated community in Hampshire County, West Virginia, United States on the Virginia state line. Lehew is located on Timber Ridge along West Virginia Route 259 at its crossroads with H.G. Brill Road (County Route 23/4) and White Pine Ridge Road (County Route 23/12).

The community most likely was named after an early settler.

Historic sites
Capon School, WV 259
Shiloh United Methodist Church, WV 259

References

External links

Unincorporated communities in Hampshire County, West Virginia
Unincorporated communities in West Virginia